Fugou County is a county of east-central Henan province, China. It is under the administration of Zhoukou city.

Administrative divisions
As 2012, this county is divided to 9 towns and 6 townships.
Towns

Townships

Climate

See also
 Shuping Wang

References

 
County-level divisions of Henan
Zhoukou